Priya Badlani (born 27 January 1985) is an Indian actress and a former model. She appears in Bollywood films. She is best known as Aanya Shroff on Zee TV's Serial Jabb Love Hua. She made her first appearance in a Coca-Cola commercial alongside Aamir Khan. She had cameos in movies like Naach (2004 film) and Silsilay before making her big break in Zee TV's Jabb Love Hua.

Personal life

Badlani was born on 27 January 1975 in Mumbai, India. She follows Hinduism as religion. She had chosen fashion photographer as profession since she had studied Graphics Designing in college.

Career 

She made her first appearance in a Coca-Cola commercial alongside Aamir Khan. She had also worked for several brands such as Fair and Lovely, Vatika, Hansel. In 2004, she had a Cameo appearance in movie Naach (2004 film). In 2005, she again had a cameo role in Silsilay, which she followed with modeling. She also appeared in The Fashion Magazine where she ranked at the 24th position in the list of Most attractive women in India. In 2007, she appeared in Zee TV's serial Jabb Love Hua.

References

External links
 

Living people
Actresses from Mumbai
Indian television actresses
Indian soap opera actresses
1986 births
21st-century Indian actresses